{{DISPLAYTITLE:C18H17O7}}

The molecular formula C18H17O7 (or C18H17O7+, molar mass : 345.32 g/mol, exact mass : 345.097428) may refer to :
 Capensinidin, an anthocyanidin
 Hirsutidin, an anthocyanidin